Boris Klavora (born 20 May 1941 in Bled) is a Slovenian rower who competed for Yugoslavia in the men's eight at the 1964 Summer Olympics.

External links 
 
 

1941 births
Living people
Yugoslav male rowers
Slovenian male rowers
People from Bled
Rowers at the 1964 Summer Olympics
Olympic rowers of Yugoslavia
European Rowing Championships medalists